Florence Barker may refer to:
 Florence Barker (swimmer) (1908–1986), British swimmer
 Florence Barker (actress) (1891–1913), American actress